Nazir Ahmad Khan (1904 – 26 August 1983) was a Pakistani film actor, director and producer.

Biography

It was back in 1929, when a young artistic man left the city of Lahore to go to Calcutta to fulfill his passion and make movies. This man was Nazir Ahmed Khan (1910-1983), a Kakazai Pathan, determined to make a mark on the silver screen of the sub-continent. Nazir Ahmed Khan was a versatile and renowned Pakistani/Indian film actor, director and producer. He was the first successful film hero in Pre-Partition India and later in Pakistan. He was widely known as Bao Jee in the film industries on both sides of the border.
It was in the late 1920s when Nazir went to Calcutta along with AR Kardar, and appeared in a character role in Kardar’s ‘Sarfarosh’ aka ‘Brave Heart’ in 1929. Kardar later made ‘Heer’ in which Nazir played the role of the Qazi. Both these films are from the silent era. He also did a secondary role in Kardar’s ‘Mysterious Bandit’.
Nazir’s artistic elegance and excellent command over acting won him applaud all across the industry and resulted in him going to Bombay. During this period he was cast in important leading roles in ‘Rajputana Ka Sher’, ‘Chandaal Chaukri’, ‘Badmaash Ka Baita’ and ‘Pahari Sawar’. In 1934 he went back to Calcutta on the request of his old friend Kardar to act in important roles in his productions of ‘Chandra Gupta’, ‘Sultana’, ‘Milaap’, ‘Mandar’, ‘Night Bird’ and ‘Aab-e-Hayat’. He also worked as the lead in Ezra Mir’s ‘Badroohi’ and ‘Zareena’.
In Calcutta Nazir won laurels for his dynamic role of Chanakiya in ‘Chandra Gupta’. Nazir had his head shaved off completely to authentically perform the role of the cunning prime minister. In 1939, both Nazir and Kardar moved to Bombay and under Kardar’s banner he performed his most well remembered and renowned character role in ‘Baghbaan’, which besides creating box office records also established Nazir’s name as one of the most well refined sensitive and matured actor of his era.

Nazir was one of the pioneers of the film industry in India. He is the only hero in history to have been cast opposite 35 actresses most of whom were the reigning queens of their time. Nazir started producing and directing films under the banner of Hind Pictures and established a Studio in Bombay under the same name, although this did not stop him from accepting assignments from other producers.
Nazir was associated with almost 200 films during his career, which spanned over a period of 55 years. Only a few artistes have contributed more to the development of cinema in the sub-continent than Nazir. He was a talented actor, a vibrant director and an astute producer. Nazir’s studio and the offices of Hind Pictures were burnt down during the partition riots as Nazir had daringly hoisted the flag of the then Muslim League there. He stood there patiently, smoking his packet of cigarettes looking at burning of the birthplace of such great films, in disgust. Once the ashes started cooling he left never to return to Bombay ever again. In 1947, Nazir migrated to Pakistan.

He left everything he had behind in Bombay and shifted to Lahore. He started from scratch and in the process became one of the pioneers of the Pakistan film industry. He produced and directed ‘Saachai’, as his first film in the newly born Pakistan. It was followed by the first Silver Jubilee film of Pakistani Cinema, ‘Pheray’. He disassociated himself with the Pakistani Cinema, when he foresaw the decline in this industry. He could not reconcile himself with the qualitatively declining trends in this industry which was later to be dominated by financiers whose aim was Glamour and Easy Profits. He left the world for his eternal ethereal abode in August 1983. Today, the son of Late Nazir, Akhtar Nazir Khan aka Cooki is intensively engaged in reviving the Pakistani Cinema and work hard to provide the audience both home and abroad with the same perfectly mastered and creative films that once were a pride of the Legacy of Legends of the Sub-Continental Cinema.

Personal life
Nazir was born in 1904 in a Kakazai family in Lahore, Punjab, British India. He had at least three wives over the years. He was first married to his cousin Sikandara Begum (who was the sister of K. Asif, the legendary director of 1960 film Mughal-e-Azam). He later had a very short marriage with Sitara Devi, the legendary Kathak dancer. After their divorce, Sitara Devi married none other than Nazir's cousin K. Asif himself. In other words, she married first the husband and then the brother of Sikandara Begum. Nazir's last wife was film actress Swaran Lata. 

Nazir was the father of several children. He gave one of his daughters in marriage to actor Nasir Khan (brother of Dilip Kumar).

Awards and recognition
 Nigar Award 'Special Nigar Award for 30 years of excellence' in Pakistani film industry in 1982.

Death
Nazir Ahmed Khan died on 26 August 1983.

Legacy
Today, the son of Late Nazir, Akhtar Nazir Khan aka Cooki and his grandson Asif Nazir Khan, under the banner of Nazir Asif Arts dedicated to Nazir and K.Asif, are intensively engaged in reviving the Pakistani Cinema and working hard to provide the audience both home and abroad with the same perfectly mastered and creative films and songs that once were a pride of the Legacy of Legends of the Sub-Continental Cinema.

Filmography

 Sawaal        (1966)
 Azmat-e-Islam (1965)
 Haveli        (1964)
 Billo Jee     (1962)
 Shama         (1959)
 Noor-e-Islam  (1957)
 Sabira        (1956)
Soteeli Maa    (1956)
Wehshi         (1956)
Hameeda        (1956)
Nagin          (1955)
Naukar         (1955)
Heer (1955)
Khatoon        (1952)
Bheegi Palkain (1950)
Anokhi Dastan  (1950)
Humari Basti   (1950)
Ghalat Fahmi   (1950)
Laraay         (1949)
Pheray        (1949)
Sachchai       (1947)
Heer           (1946)
Wamaq Azra     (1946)
 Gaon Ki Gori  (1945)
Laila Majnu    (1945)
Naatak         (1944)
"Aabroo".  (1943)
 Ghar Sansar   (1942)
Maa Baap       (1941)
Swami          (1941)
 Taj Mahal   (1941)
Apni Nagariya  (1939)
Joshe Islam    (1938)
Baghban (1938)
Bhabi          (1938)
Sitara Tanzi   (1937)
Dukhiyari      (1936)
Pratima        (1935)
Delhi Ka Thug  (1934)
Iraq Ka Chor   (1934)
Chandragupta   (1934)
Sultana (1934)Night Bird     (1933)Abe Hayat      (1933)Lal-e-Yaman    (1933)Zarina         (1932)Farebi Daku''  (1931)

See also 
 List of Lollywood actors
List of Pakistani film directors

References

External links
 , Nazir Ahmed Khan's Filmography

1904 births
1983 deaths
Film directors from Lahore
Male actors from Lahore
Nigar Award winners
Pakistani male film actors
Pakistani film directors
Pakistani film producers
People from British India
Punjabi-language film directors
20th-century Pakistani male actors